Sir Robert Gibson GBE (4 November 1863 – 1 January 1934) was a Scottish-born Australian businessman, a president of the Associated Chambers of Manufactures of Australia.

Early life
Gibson was born at Falkirk, Scotland, the third son of John Edward Gibson, metal manufacturer, and his wife Harriette, née Hicks. Gibson was educated at Falkirk High School and joined the Camelon Iron Company, of which his father was managing director, at 15 years of age. In 1883 he was apprenticed to Robert Gardner and Company, Glasgow, and studied art and design at the Haldane academy.

Career
In 1887 Gibson rejoined the Camelon Iron Company as a designer, and was soon appointed manager of its London office. Gibson married Winifred Moore of Glasgow on 22 March 1890, and sailed to Australia the same day, following two brothers. He was a designer and draughtsman for about six years at Melbourne. In 1897, he established the Austral Manufacturing Company Pty Ltd.

Some 10 years later he founded the Lux Foundry Pty Ltd, and held a controlling interest in these companies for the rest of his life. During World War I he did valuable work as a member of the coal board regarding the rationing of coal, gas and electric power. He was appointed one of the seven honorary commissioners to administer the repatriation act, and was deputy chairman until the appointment of the permanent commission in 1920.

He was chairman of the royal commission on federal economics, and was a member of the Victorian State electricity commission from its inception. He had great confidence in the future value of the works at Yallourn. In 1924 he was appointed a member of the Commonwealth Bank board, was elected chairman in 1926, and was re-elected to that position each year.

He was a director of the Union Trustee Company Ltd., the National Mutual Life Association, the Chamber of Manufactures Insurance Company Ltd., and Robert Harper and Company Ltd. and served as a representative of the Commonwealth government regarding Commonwealth Oil Refineries Ltd.

When the Scullin government was endeavouring to grapple with the position, which was aggravated in Australia by the low prices being paid for wool and wheat, various currency devices were brought forward, and Gibson's firm attitude towards E. G. Theodore, the treasurer of the day, eventually made possible the adoption of the premiers' plan. There was some intriguing to displace Gibson from the Commonwealth bank board but these efforts were defeated.

On 6 May 1931 he was called before the bar of the senate to give his views on the Commonwealth bank bill. He replied to the many questions asked fully and patiently and with such effect that it was said that the bill was dead before he left the chamber. An experienced reporter described it as the finest performance he had ever seen in parliament. Gibson, while disclaiming any intention that the Commonwealth bank should dictate to the government, was determined that no efforts should be spared to prevent inflation; in this he was successful.

Late life and legacy
Gibson had a serious illness in 1933 and died in South Yarra on 1 January 1934. Lady Gibson survived him with two sons and five daughters. He was created CBE in 1918, KBE in 1920 and GBE in 1932.

References
C. B. Schedvin, 'Gibson, Sir Robert (1863–1934)', Australian Dictionary of Biography, Volume 8, MUP, 1981, pp 654–56; retrieved 5 November 2008.

1863 births
1934 deaths
Australian businesspeople
Australian Knights Grand Cross of the Order of the British Empire
Commonwealth Bank people